Karamyan is an Armenian surname. Notable people with the surname include:

Arman Karamyan (born 1979), Armenian-Russian footballer, twin brother of Artavazd
Artavazd Karamyan (born 1979), Armenian-Russian footballer, twin brother of Arman
Yuri Karamyan (born 1947), Russian football coach

Armenian-language surnames